Shirley Township is a township in Cloud County, Kansas, USA.  As of the 2000 census, its population was 178.

Demographics
Shirley is an historically French American community, most of whom are of French Canadian ancestry.

History
Shirley Township was organized in 1866.

Geography
According to the USGS, it contains two cemeteries: Cedar Hill and Pleasant View.

The stream of Beaver Creek runs through this township.

References

 USGS Geographic Names Information System (GNIS)

External links
 US-Counties.com
 City-Data.com

French-Canadian American history
Townships in Cloud County, Kansas
Townships in Kansas